Olaf Rompelberg (born 30 January 1987 in Heerlen) is a Dutch footballer who currently plays for Excelsior Veldwezelt.

Career
Rompelberg is a defender who made his debut in professional football, being part of the Roda JC squad in the 2005-06 season.

References

1987 births
Living people
Dutch footballers
Roda JC Kerkrade players
Sportspeople from Heerlen
Association football defenders
Footballers from Limburg (Netherlands)
21st-century Dutch people